Nancy Glass  is CEO of Glass Entertainment Group and formerly an American television and radio host.

Career

Nancy Glass is currently the owner of Glass Entertainment Group. In 2019, 2020, 2021 and 2022, her company was named as part of the Global 100, the listing of the top 100 production companies in the world.  Her company has produced two thousand hours of programming for various networks including: A&E, E!, TLC, WE, LOGO, National Geographic, Animal Planet, HGTV, CNN, Oxygen and XM/Sirius satellite radio. They have also produced hundreds of digital programs and created the podcast: Confronting O. J. Simpson hosted by Kim Goldman. It was one of the most downloaded podcasts of 2019. In 2021 she appeared on the ABC sitcom, The Goldbergs. She played herself in the 80's.

Previously she was an on-air personality. In 1993, Glass was an anchor for the King World syndicated news magazine, American Journal. She hosted the show until 1997 when she left to do a pilot for her own talk show for ABC.  Prior to that she was senior correspondent and weekend anchor for Inside Edition. While working at Inside Edition she became the first person in syndication nominated for a national News Emmy. She came to Inside Edition from another nationally syndicated news magazine, This Evening. It was the first national news magazine where the solo anchor was a woman.  Before that, she had three jobs at once. She was the co-host of Attitudes on Lifetime. Attitudes earned her an Emmy nomination as Best Daytime Talk Show Host. While hosting Attitudes she also hosted a nightly newsmagazine show, Evening Magazine, airing on KYW (then the NBC affiliate) in Philadelphia and added humor to the PBS series Sneak Previews, reporting on the weekly "golden turkeys". Prior to this, she was the weekend anchor and reporter for Channel 5 in New York (WNYW). She worked in New York after spending a year working in Cleveland at the NBC-owned station where she had also three jobs at once. She hosted the morning talk show (ZAP!) and an afternoon dance show, and contributed movie reviews to the 11 pm news. She got her job in Cleveland right out of college.

She began her television career while attending Tufts University in Boston. In her sophomore year she became a management trainee at WBZ, the CBS affiliate. In her junior year she became a producer. She went on the air in her senior year as a tipster on Boston's Evening Magazine program.

In 2021, it was announced that Glass and Marcus Lemonis have acquired the rights of the game show Let's Make a Deal.

Other notable television and radio jobs include: Co-Host of the Miss America Pageant in 1997,  repeatedly appeared as a square on Hollywood Squares,  hosted a popular morning radio show in Philadelphia on STAR 104.5. She also hosted the emmy-nominated Gardens Great and Small on PBS. 

When not overseeing her company, Glass Entertainment Group, Glass has appeared as a guest or guest-host on such programs as The Daily Show, The Big Idea with Donny Deutsch, CNN Larry King Live, Late Night with Conan O'Brien, CBS Morning News, Hollywood Squares, Court TV, MSNBC and as a host on WOR-radio in New York City. She has been featured in: People, Entertainment Weekly, TV Guide, Redbook, Ladies Home Journal, Bazaar, Vogue, Fitness, Glamour, Time, The New York Times, The Los Angeles Times, The Chicago Tribune, The Philadelphia Inquirer and hundreds more publications.

Glass is Chair of the Board of Advisors at Tufts University’s School of Arts and Sciences.  In this capacity, she has enabled the educational establishment to set up an endowed scholarship for one of their students.  Glass explained, “The more I learn about the school, the more I admire the way it is run and the goals set by the administration. Scholarships are very important to Tufts and I want to show my support by giving. I want as many kids as possible to have the phenomenal experience that I had at Tufts.”.  As well, in 2009, Glass pledged an undisclosed amount of money for an endowed scholarship for the Beyond Boundaries capital campaign for Tufts.

Glass is married to Charles Lachman, he is a pulitzer prize nominee and  author of "The Last Lincolns", "In the Name of the Law", "Footsteps in the Snow" and "A Secret Life...The lies and scandals of Grover Cleveland". Charles Lachman is currently the Executive Producer of Inside Edition, an entertainment show run by CBS.

References

External links

 The Official Web Site of Glass Entertainment Group

American television personalities
American women television personalities
Writers from Boston
Tufts University alumni
American women chief executives